Ivan Solodovnikov (April 9, 1985, Moscow) is a Russian political figure, deputy of the 8th State Duma. 

From January 2013 to July 2014, Solodovnikov worked as Deputy General Director for Economics and Finance of Snabstroy LLC. From December 2019 to September 2021, he was the Director of the MoszhilNIIproekt. In 2021, Solodnikov also served as an adviser to the Governor of the Kursk Oblast Roman Starovoyt on a voluntary basis. Since September 2021, he has served as deputy of the 8th State Duma from the Kursk Oblast constituency.

In February 2022, Solodnikov was one of the 16 deputies who voted against the recognition of the Donetsk People's Republic and the Luhansk People's Republic.

References

1985 births
Living people
United Russia politicians
21st-century Russian politicians
Eighth convocation members of the State Duma (Russian Federation)